Nagyatád is a district in central-southern part of Somogy County. Nagyatád is also the name of the town where the district seat is found. The district is located in the Southern Transdanubia Statistical Region.

Geography 
Nagyatád District borders with Marcali District to the north, Kaposvár District to the east, Barcs District to the south, Csurgó District to the west. The number of the inhabited places in Nagyatád District is 18.

Municipalities 
The district has 1 town and 17 villages.
(ordered by population, as of 1 January 2013)

The bolded municipality is city.

See also
List of cities and towns in Hungary

References

External links
 Postal codes of the Nagyatád District

Districts in Somogy County